Gleason is a town in Weakley County, Tennessee, United States. The population was 1,445 at the 2010 census. The city also holds the annual Tater Town Parade and festival in the fall, and the Hometown Christmas event. The Ladies High School basketball team, the Lady Bulldogs, won the State Championship in 1992, 1999 and 2007.

Gleason is a generally conservative town with conservative values, but other than political opinions few things are important to residents: girls' basketball, Dollar General, and fund raisers. Throughout the year, several fund raisers are held, with notable ones being the football team's annual Coca-Cola fund raiser, the Beta Club's annual Gleason apparel fund raiser, and the softball team's annual Krispy Kreme fund raiser.

Geography
Gleason is located at  (36.215641, -88.612114).

Demographics

2020 census

As of the 2020 United States census, there were 1,369 people, 604 households, and 394 families residing in the town.

2000 census
As of the census of 2000, there were 1,463 people, 599 households, and 431 families residing in the town. The population density was 640.5 people per square mile (247.7/km2). There were 657 housing units at an average density of 287.6 per square mile (111.3/km2). The racial makeup of the town was 98.43% White, 0.55% African American, 0.34% Native American, 0.41% from other races, and 0.27% from two or more races. Hispanic or Latino of any race were 1.37% of the population.

There were 599 households, out of which 36.2% had children under the age of 18 living with them, 54.3% were married couples living together, 12.4% had a female householder with no husband present, and 27.9% were non-families. 25.4% of all households were made up of individuals, and 11.9% had someone living alone who was 65 years of age or older. The average household size was 2.44 and the average family size was 2.89.

In the town, the population was spread out, with 27.5% under the age of 18, 7.3% from 18 to 24, 28.2% from 25 to 44, 22.9% from 45 to 64, and 14.1% who were 65 years of age or older. The median age was 35 years. For every 100 females, there were 91.2 males. For every 100 females age 18 and over, there were 86.6 males.

The median income for a household in the town was $29,597, and the median income for a family was $35,000. Males had a median income of $26,397 versus $19,643 for females. The per capita income for the town was $13,747. About 13.6% of families and 15.0% of the population were below the poverty line, including 18.4% of those under age 18 and 16.4% of those age 65 or over.

Notable Natives 
Mike Snider, Grand Ole Opry star, was born and maintains a home in Gleason.
Ashley McElhiney, attended Gleason School and won the Tennessee State 1A Miss Basketball in 1999.  After a spectacular basketball career at Vanderbilt University, she became the first female manager of a male professional basketball team, the Nashville Rhythm.

Gleason School 
The most notable building in the town is Gleason School, a Pre-K through 12 school with a population of 470 (2017) in the Weakley County School system. The school is split into three parts, the Elementary School (K-5), the Junior High School (6-8), and the High School (9-12).

Junior high school 
GJHS is home to three clubs:The Junior High Beta Club,

Media
 WRQR-FM 105.5 "Today's Best Music with "Ace & TJ in the Morning"
 WTPR-AM 710 "The Greatest Hits of All Time"
 WTPR-FM 101.7 "The Greatest Hits of All Time"
 WFGS-FM 103.7,  Froggy

References

External links

 City website
 School website

Towns in Tennessee
Towns in Weakley County, Tennessee